The  Atlanta Falcons season was the franchise's 38th season in the National Football League (NFL). It is best remembered for the third preseason game, in which quarterback Michael Vick broke his leg and was done for most of the season. Atlanta had two other quarterbacks take over for a combined 2–10 record (Doug Johnson and Kurt Kittner). Vick returned in week 14 and ended the season with a 3–1 record.

After losing seven straight games, Dan Reeves was let go by Falcons management, and Wade Phillps took over for the rest of the season.

For the season, the Falcons sported a new logo and uniforms.

Offseason

NFL Draft

Personnel

Staff

Roster

Regular season

Schedule
In the 2003 regular season, the Falcons’ non-divisional, conference opponents were primarily from the NFC East, although they also played the Minnesota Vikings from the NFC North, and the St. Louis Rams from the NFC West. Their non-conference opponents were from the AFC South. This was the first occasion when the Falcons played the Washington Redskins since 1994, due to old NFL scheduling formulas in place prior to 2002, whereby teams had no rotating schedule opposing members of other divisions within their own conference, but instead played interdivisional conference games according to position within a season’s table.

Standings

References

External links
 2003 Atlanta Falcons at Pro-Football-Reference.com

Atlanta Falcons
Atlanta Falcons seasons
Atlanta